Norwegian Grand Prix can refer to:

Norwegian Grand Prix, a Formula One motor race
Speedway Grand Prix of Norway
Melodi Grand Prix, sometimes Norwegian Melodi Grand Prix, an annual music competition organised by Norsk Rikskringkasting